Nailed may refer to:

 Nailed (Cecil Taylor album), 2000
 Nailed (Place of Skulls album), 2001
 Nailed, a 1987 demo album by the Crucified
 "Nailed" (Better Call Saul), a television episode
 "Nailed" (CSI: Miami), a television episode
 Accidental Love, working title Nailed, a 2015 film by David O. Russell
 Nailed, a 2001 film starring Harvey Keitel
 Nailed, a play by Caleb Lewis

See also
 Nail (disambiguation)